The Austin City Limits (ACL) Music Festival is an annual music festival held in Zilker Park in Austin, Texas on two consecutive three-day weekends. Inspired by the KLRU/PBS music series of the same name, the festival is produced by Austin-based company C3 Presents, which also produces Chicago's Lollapalooza.

The ACL Music Festival has eight stages where musical groups from genres including rock, indie, country, folk, electronic, and hip hop perform for fans. The concerts continue from 10 AM to 10 PM on Friday, Saturday, and Sunday during the festival with various stages spread out in the park. Approximately 450,000 people attend the festival each year. In addition to the music performances, there are food and drinks, an art market, a kids area for families, and other activities for attendees.

History
Founded in 2002, the festival began as a one-weekend event and remained as such through the 2012 date. On August 16, 2012, Austin City Council members voted unanimously to allow the Austin City Limits Music Festival to expand to two consecutive weekends beginning in 2013. Artists who have played at the festival include Metallica, Red Hot Chili Peppers, Depeche Mode, The Cure, Arctic Monkeys, Guns N' Roses, Tame Impala, Robyn, Arcade Fire, Muse, Vampire Weekend, The Flaming Lips, Radiohead, Nick Cave and the Bad Seeds, Pearl Jam, Foo Fighters, Austin native Gary Clark Jr., and more. 

In July 2020, the festival was called off due to the COVID-19 crisis.

In May 2022, it was announced that Hulu will exclusively stream the festival, as well as Bonnaroo Music Festival and Lollapalooza.

Relationship to television series 

The Austin City Limits television series was the inspiration (and later the impetus for the expanded commercial collaboration) that led to the success of the first music festival.

The historic Austin City Limits television series was founded on the principles of musical and cultural diversity and initially focused on Texas singer/songwriters, country, and folk performers.

The first iteration of the show gave a voice to musicians struggling to be heard.

This all-inclusive approach to music and how it’s made led to collaborations with musical and instrumental talents from every genre and geography.

Vendors

The Festival's food court, called Austin Eats, was modeled after the Jazz Fest in New Orleans. Austin Eats features vendors from local Austin restaurants and offers gluten-free and vegetarian options.

The ACL Art Market features numerous art vendors and is located in the center of Zilker Park; all booths are open throughout the duration of the festival.

International expansion

Auckland City Limits
In 2015 it was announced that the Auckland City Limits Music Festival would debut at Western Springs stadium in Auckland, New Zealand in early October 2016. The festival showcased over 40 artists from a broad spectrum of musical genres, and highlight local culinary, artisans, festival fashion, an area for children, and a new festival forum for speaking on and exchanging cultural and innovative ideas.

Sydney City Limits
In the spring of 2018 Sydney City Limits made its debut at Brazilian Fields and Parade Grounds at Centennial Park in Sydney, Australia. This festival was one day and featured 28 bands on four stages. It had many of the same activities and features as Austin City Limits such as Sydney Eats, Sydney Market, and Sydney Kiddie Limits.

List of lineups by year

See also 

 35 Denton
 South by Southwest

References

External links 

 

Austin City Limits
Festivals in Austin, Texas
Indie rock festivals
Music festivals established in 2002
Music festivals in Texas
Music of Austin, Texas
Pop music festivals in the United States
Rock festivals in the United States
2002 establishments in Texas